Khemirao Sarnaik (Hi: खेमीराव सरनाईक) also known as Kheni Sirnayak was a Koli Deshmukh of the Maval region in 1640s and had taken up arms against Mughal governor, Aurangzeb and abolished Jizya. he belongs to the Thorat clan of Mahadev Kolis of Maharashtra. When shivaji began his revolts in following decades, the kolis were amongst the  first to join shivaji under Khemirao Sarnaik. The Koli community made a substantial contribution to the success of the Swarajya movement of Shivaji under Khemirao Sarnaik and shaked the Mughal rule. Aurangzeb put down the revolt mercilessly and made a pile of the heads cut off. The 'Koli Chabutra' in Purandar fort still stands as a monument to the Kolis' love of independence and their excitable temper.

According to historian Govind Sadasiva Ghurye, the main reason for the rebellion was the imposition of land tax (Jaziya) by Sultan Aurangzeb.  The Koli Zamidars had taken up arms against the Sultan Aurangzeb under the leadership of Khemirao Sarnaik, as well as with the sympathy of Shivaji as it was a great benefit to Shivaji. Khemrao assembled all the Koli naiks and promised that he would get rid of Mughal rule in a single rise. Aurangzeb sent the Mughal army from the hilly areas to suppress the Koli rebellion, but the battle was very fierce in which thousands of Kolis were killed and the Mughal soldiers also. The Koli rebellion shook Aurangzeb. Sarnaik applied for help from Shivaji but Shivaji was unable to help Kolis because of their political matters and sarnaik was refused. The Khemirao Sarnaik fighting in this battle was killed by Mughal commander Nerrulaa, but the Koli rebellion was so intense that Aurangzeb got compelled to think. after the rebellion was crushed, the Kolis were treated with kindness by Aurangzeb and than Kolis achieve the high reputation under Peshwa for their daring and taking hill forts such as Kanhoji Angre and Tanaji Malusare.

Cause of rebel 
The reason for the Koli revolt was Aurangzeb's imposition of Jiziya (tax on the land of Hindus) on Hindus. After which Sarnaik, fed up with Jiziya, united the people of his caste (Mahadev Koli) and planned a revolt against the Sultan. But a lot of power was required to fight Aurangzeb for which Sarnaik Khemirao went to Shivaji Raje Bhosle as Sarnaik believed that Shivaji would accompany him in the fight against Aurangzeb as the Kolis fought for Shivaji against the Bijapur Sultanate. Anyway, Shivaji was to benefit from the Mahadev Koli rebellion against Aurangzeb. At the same time Sarnaik also sought help from the king of princely state of Jawhar because the king of Jawhar also belonged to the Koli caste, after which Khemirao Sarnaik revolted against Aurangzeb, the Sultan of the Mughal Empire.

Clash of clan 
After the death of Khemirao Sarnaik, Aurangzeb killed the family and relatives of the Thorat clan of Khemirao Sarnaik and also started killing the other Kolis of the Thorat clan so that no one could revolt the Koli of Thorat clan again. Aurangzeb started searching for the Kollis of the Thorat clan in hilly, sandy and forest areas so that they could be put to death. After which Aurangzeb took the Kolis to Junnar and beheaded everyone at the Shivneri Fort, but later Sultan Aurangzeb built a monument at the same place known as Koli Chabutara to pay respect to the martyred Kolis and Aurangzeb reputed the kolis in his territory for their love to country.

Titles 
 Naik - Khemirao was the Naik or chief of Mahadev Kolis of Thorat clan who used to deal with social problems and maintain order in the Koli of Thorat clanship.
 Sarnaik - Khemirao was conferred with the title of Sarnaik before the rebellion by koli chiefs and other hindu Sardars for assembling the koli Naiks of other clans and leading the rebellion.
 Deshmukh - Khemirao was Deshmukh of Maval region (52 valleys or Bavan Mavals) as independent ruler and known as Mavala.

See also 
 List of Koli people
 List of Koli states and clans
 Tanaji Malusare

References 

Indian warriors
Maratha Light Infantry officers 
Shivaji 
Koli people 
Year of birth unknown
1650 deaths
Indian independence movement 
Indian independence activists